VVVVVV is a 2010 puzzle-platform game created by Terry Cavanagh.  In the game, the player controls Captain Viridian, who must rescue their spacecrew after a teleporter malfunction caused them to be separated in Dimension VVVVVV. The gameplay is characterized by the inability of the player to jump, instead opting on controlling the direction of gravity, causing the player to fall upwards or downwards. The game consists of more than 400 individual rooms, and also supports the creation of user-created levels.

The game was built in Adobe Flash and released on January 11, 2010, for Microsoft Windows and OS X. The game was ported to C++ by Simon Roth in 2011, and released as part of the Humble Indie Bundle #3. The port to C++ allowed the porting of the game to other platforms such as Linux, Pandora, Nintendo 3DS, and Nintendo Switch.

Gameplay 

Unlike most platforming games, in VVVVVV the player is not able to jump, but instead can reverse the direction of gravity when standing on a surface, causing Captain Viridian to fall either upwards or downwards.  This feature was first seen in the 1986 8-bit game Terminus. The player uses this mechanic to traverse the game's environment and avoid various hazards, including stationary spikes and moving enemies.

Later areas introduce new mechanics such as moving floors or rooms which, upon touching one edge of the screen, cause the player character to appear on the other side.

VVVVVV contains eight main levels, including an intro level, four levels which can be accessed in a non-linear sequence, two intermission levels, and one final level, only seen outside Dimension VVVVVV (in a "polar dimension"). These are situated inside a large open world for the player to explore, spanning more than 400 individual rooms.  Due to its high level of difficulty, the game world contains many checkpoints, to which the player's character is reset upon death.

Plot 
The player controls Captain Viridian, who at the outset of VVVVVV must evacuate the spaceship along with the captain's crew, when the ship becomes affected by "dimensional interference".  The crew escapes through a teleporter on the ship; however, Captain Viridian becomes separated from the rest of the crew on the other end of the teleporter.  Upon returning to the ship, the Captain learns that the ship is trapped in an alternative dimension (referred to as Dimension VVVVVV), and that the ship's crew has been scattered throughout this dimension. The player's goal, as Captain Viridian, is to rescue the missing crew members and find the cause of the dimensional interference.

Development 
The gravity-flipping mechanic of VVVVVV is based on an earlier game designed by Cavanagh titled Sine Wave Ninja.  In an interview with IndieGames.com, Cavanagh said that he was interested in using this idea as a core concept of a game, something he felt other games which include a gravity-flipping mechanism had never done before.

Cavanagh first unveiled VVVVVV on his blog in June 2009.  The game had been in development for two weeks, and Cavanagh estimated that the game would be finished in another two, "but hopefully not much longer."  A follow-up post published in July 2009 included screenshots of the game and an explanation of the game's gravity-flipping mechanic.  Cavanagh wrote that VVVVVV, unlike some of his previous work such as Judith and Pathways, would not be a "storytelling experiment", but rather "focused on the level design".  The game was first shown publicly at the 2009 Eurogamer Expo, which gave Cavanagh the opportunity to collect feedback from players.  In December 2009, a beta version of VVVVVV which had been given to donors was leaked on 4chan.

The visual style of VVVVVV is heavily inspired by 8-bit computer games from the 1980s, especially Jet Set Willy and Monty on the Run, which is referenced by the element of collecting difficult-to-reach shiny objects and most notably the naming of each room; Cavanagh aimed to create a game "that looked and felt like the C64 games I grew up with." He eventually entrusted naming the rooms to QWOP developer Bennett Foddy, who created every room name in the final version. The graphical style of VVVVVV is heavily influenced by games such as Monty on the Run; similarly, the game's music is heavily dependent on chiptune elements. Swedish composer Magnus Pålsson scored the game, and released the original soundtrack in 2010, titled PPPPPP.

Cavanagh also considered this game an opportunity to indulge in his "retro fetish".  He has said because he lacks the technical prowess to make more modern-looking games, he instead focuses on making them visually interesting; additionally, he finds this to be made easier by "work[ing] within narrow limits". VVVVVV was the first game which Cavanagh sold commercially.  While his previous games were all released as freeware, due to the size of VVVVVV compared to his previous work, Cavanagh felt that he "couldn't see [himself] going down that route."

VVVVVV contains many strange visual elements, most notable of which being the sad elephant, sometimes also called the elephant in the room, which is a large elephant with a tear dropping from its eye. It spans four rooms near the Space Station area of Dimension VVVVVV, flickering constantly from color to color. If the player stands near the elephant for a short period of time, it will cause Captain Viridian to become sad. The elephant serves no function to the game, but has served to provoke much discussion about its meaning or symbolism amongst fans of the game. Similarly to many of the enemies in the game, the sad elephant originated in dream journals kept by creator Terry Cavanagh and not from Jet Set Willy as once believed.

Release 
VVVVVV was released on January 11, 2010, for Microsoft Windows and Mac OS X. A trial version of the game is playable on the website Kongregate.  A Linux version was in development, but a number of technical difficulties arose in the porting process, which led Cavanagh to cancel it for the time being.

The game was rewritten in C++ by games developer Simon Roth in 2011, allowing Linux support to be successfully implemented. This formed version 2.0 of VVVVVV, launched on July 24, 2011, as part of the third Humble Indie Bundle. Version 2.0 also features support for custom levels, and a level editor. The C++ port also allowed for the implementation of new graphics modes and various speed improvements. Version 2.0, however, does not support saved games from the original Flash version of VVVVVV; many players received this update via Steam without warning, and hence were unable to continue their existing saved games. A save-file exporter is in development.

Based on this source code it was also ported in 2011 for the Open Pandora, which requires the data files from the Microsoft Windows, Mac OS X or Linux version of the game to work.

On October 7, 2011, it was announced that a version of the game was being made for Nintendo 3DS by Nicalis. It was released on December 29, 2011, in North America and May 10, 2012, in Europe. The Nintendo 3DS version was eventually released in Japan on October 12, 2016, courtesy of Japanese publisher Pikii. In 2010, a demo of the game's early levels was ported to the Commodore 64 by programmer Paul Koller, with Cavanagh's assistance. In April 2017 a complete port to the Commodore 64 was released by developer Laxity. On the 10th anniversary of the game's release in January 2020, Cavanagh made its source code publicly available on GitHub.

Soundtrack 

The soundtrack of VVVVVV was composed by chiptune musician Magnus Pålsson (also known as SoulEye). Cavanagh approached Pålsson to compose VVVVVV after playing Space Phallus, an indie game by Charlie's Games, which featured a song by him.  Pålsson wrote on the Distractionware blog that, upon playing Cavanagh's previous games, he was "amazed at the depth that came with the games, even though they were small and short."  In writing the music for VVVVVV, Pålsson aimed to make "uptempo happy songs that would ingrain themselves into your minds whether you want to or not, hopefully so much so that you’d go humming on them when not playing, and making you want to come back to the game even more." The complete soundtrack, titled PPPPPP, was released on January 10, 2010, alongside VVVVVV and is sold as a music download or CD on Pålsson's personal website. On June 12, 2014, Pålsson released a power metal version of the soundtrack titled MMMMMM which was arranged and performed by guitarist Jules Conroy.  The album contains a mod file to replace the in-game music with the metal tracks. Video game record label Materia Collective released a 180g picture disc vinyl LP edition on January 11, 2020.

Reception 

VVVVVV has been generally well received by critics, earning a score of 81/100 for the Windows version and 83/100 for the 3DS version on review aggregator website Metacritic. The game was noted for being the first important independent release of 2010; Kieron Gillen of Rock, Paper, Shotgun called it "the first great Indie game of the year", while Michael Rose, writing for IndieGames.com, noted that the release of VVVVVV followed a year which "some may argue...didn't really deliver an outstanding indie title which showed the mainstream that independent developers mean business."  The level design of VVVVVV was lauded by critics: Rose considered the game to have no filler content, which he found to be "one of the game's strongest points".  Michael McWhertor of gaming news blog Kotaku wrote that the game's areas contained "a surprising amount of variation throughout...ensuring that VVVVVV never feels like its designer failed to explore the gameplay possibilities."

Most reviewers wrote of VVVVVV high level of difficulty.  McWhertor found that "the game's trial and error moments can seriously test one's patience."  However, several critics noted that the game's challenge is made less frustrating due to its numerous checkpoints, as well as the player's ability to retry after dying as many times as needed.  These additions made VVVVVV "not unforgiving", according to IGN staff writer Samuel Claiborn, while still being "old-school in its demands of player dedication". Independent reviewer Declan Tyson said that he feels "victimised by the game's criminally unforgiving collision detection and over-enthusiastically sensitive controls" but that "it's all worth it for when you reach the next checkpoint and feel that split second of relief". IGN’s Matthew Adler named VVVVVV the 12th hardest modern game, saying it requires quick reflexes in order to survive and that players will likely die many times.

The price of VVVVVV when it was originally released was $15.  This was seen by McWhertor as being the game's "one unfortunate barrier" to entry: "While there's plenty to see and do after blazing through the game's core campaign, the steeper than expected asking price will probably turn some off."  Likewise, Gillen wrote in his review that the cost "does strike you as a lot for an Indie lo-fi platformer", while insisting that "it is worth the money".  Since its original release, the price of VVVVVV has been reduced to $5.  On his blog, Cavanagh said that the decision was difficult to make, but added, "I know that the original price of $15 was off putting for a lot of people".

VVVVVV was awarded the IndieCade 2010 award for "Most Fun and Compelling" game in October 2010.  Game development blog Gamasutra honored VVVVVV in its year-end independent games awards, which earned second place in 2009 and an honorable mention in 2010.  The game's protagonist, Captain Viridian, is a playable character in the Windows version of the platform game Super Meat Boy.

Notes

References

External links 

 
 
 

2010 video games
Linux games
MacOS games
Android (operating system) games
Ouya games
IOS games
Flash games
Puzzle-platform games
Windows games
Indie video games
Nintendo 3DS eShop games
Nintendo Switch games
PlayStation 4 games
PlayStation Network games
PlayStation Vita games
Retro-style video games
Video games developed in Ireland
IndieCade winners
Commercial video games with freely available source code
Nicalis games